Thomas Richard Lowery (born 31 December 1997) is a Welsh professional footballer who plays as a midfielder for EFL League One club Portsmouth.

Career

Crewe Alexandra

A graduate of the Crewe Alexandra Academy, Lowery signed his first professional contract with the club in May 2016. He made his Crewe debut on 4 October 2016, coming on as a second-half substitute in an EFL Trophy tie against Wolverhampton Wanderers U23s at Gresty Road.

The diminutive midfielder made what was regarded as a "sparkling" league debut four days later, coming on at half-time against Luton Town at Kenilworth Road on 8 October 2016. Nicknamed 'Miniesta', Lowery was described as "hungry for the ball and composed and inventive with it at his feet". A week later, he was in Crewe's starting line-up at Notts County.

In January 2018, Lowery signed a new three-and-a-half year contract at Crewe. He scored his first goal for Crewe in a 2–0 defeat of Yeovil Town at Gresty Road on 19 April 2019, in his 50th League appearance.

In January 2020, after 36 Crewe appearances during the season, Lowery suffered a pelvic injury which ruled him out of several games. In October 2020, Lowery signed a new two-year contract.

He played no part in Crewe's July 2021 pre-season games after negotiations over a new contract stalled. As the contract impasse continued into August, Lowery only played an under-23s game on 16 August 2021 due to a shortage of players caused by a sickness bug; he did not otherwise feature for Crewe during the first weeks of the season. He eventually made his season debut on 31 August in a 1–0 victory at Shrewsbury Town in an EFL Trophy group tie, as manager David Artell looked to conclude further talks with Lowery and his agent, but the talks stalled again in early September. He eventually resumed league appearances, coming on as a second-half substitute and scoring Crewe's goal in a 2–1 defeat at Wycombe Wanderers on 23 October 2021. He scored three further goals as Crewe were relegated from League One; manager Alex Morris, who had replaced Artell, did not expect Lowery to extend his Crewe career beyond the end of the season.

Lowery left Crewe despite their best attempts to convince him to sign a new contract, he began training with local rivals Port Vale.

Portsmouth
On 5 August 2022, Lowery joined League One Portsmouth on a three-year contract, making his Pompey debut as a second-half substitute in a 3–0 EFL League Cup first round win at Cardiff City on 9 August 2022. During his 10th appearance, on 17 September 2023 against Plymouth Argyle, Lowery suffered a hamstring injury which ruled him out of League action until March 2023.

International career

In May 2021, he was called up to train with the Wales national squad ahead of the UEFA Euro 2020 tournament.

Statistics

References

External links

1997 births
Living people
People from Holmes Chapel
Sportspeople from Cheshire
English footballers
Association football midfielders
Crewe Alexandra F.C. players
Portsmouth F.C. players
English Football League players